The ROH Anniversary Show is a professional wrestling event, held annually by the Ring of Honor promotion. The event celebrates the anniversary of the promotion's inaugural show The Era of Honor Begins, which was held on February 23, 2002.  To coincide with this, the Anniversary Show is normally held in February, though it occasionally falls into March.

Although most years have seen a one-night celebration, the third year saw three events take place over two weekends. The fifth year went further and had five events in ROH's most popular venues, leading up to a sixth and final show in Liverpool, England across three weekends. In recent years, the Anniversary Show has become a two-night event, with a PPV broadcast followed the next day with TV tapings of the flagship Ring of Honor Wrestling program. All previous events were recorded and sold later on DVD.

The 18th Anniversary Show, which was scheduled to take place on March 13, 2020, was cancelled due to the COVID-19 pandemic. Even the 20th Anniversary Show was not held due to ROH on hiatus before its eventual sale to Tony Khan in 2022.

Dates and venues

See also
ROH Death Before Dishonor
ROH Final Battle

References

 
Professional wrestling anniversary shows